Rock is a town in Wood County, Wisconsin, United States. The population was 856 at the 2000 census. The unincorporated communities of Lindsey and Nasonville are located in the town.

Geography

According to the United States Census Bureau, the town has a total area of 34.5 square miles (89.5 km2), of which 34.5 square miles (89.4 km2) is land and 0.04 square miles (0.1 km2) (0.12%) is water.

History
The six mile square that would become Rock was first surveyed in the summer of 1851 by a crew working for the U.S. government. That fall another crew marked all the section corners of the six mile squares, walking through the woods and wading the swamps, measuring with chain and compass. When done, the deputy surveyor filed this general description:
The general character of this Township is 2d & 3d rate the soil is mostly poor loam & sand, the timber is mostly Birch Oak Aspen TamaracK & Pine the Pine is 2d growth & very poor. It is subject to fires(?) and If attended to would eventually alter the kinds of Timber to Oak as in places It can be distinctly seen where the fire has been the most severe. The streams are not durable being fed by the swamps the surface is generally level & somewhat stony  The stone being a sandstone of a reddish color.

Rock township was established in 1878.

Demographics
As of the census of 2000, there were 856 people, 291 households, and 238 families residing in the town. The population density was 24.8 people per square mile (9.6/km2). There were 316 housing units at an average density of 9.2 per square mile (3.5/km2). The racial makeup of the town was 99.65% White, 0.12% Asian, 0.12% from other races, and 0.12% from two or more races. Hispanic or Latino of any race were 0.23% of the population.

There were 291 households, out of which 43.3% had children under the age of 18 living with them, 74.6% were married couples living together, 3.1% had a female householder with no husband present, and 17.9% were non-families. 13.7% of all households were made up of individuals, and 6.2% had someone living alone who was 65 years of age or older. The average household size was 2.94 and the average family size was 3.26.

In the town, the population was spread out, with 28.7% under the age of 18, 6.5% from 18 to 24, 30.5% from 25 to 44, 24.6% from 45 to 64, and 9.6% who were 65 years of age or older. The median age was 37 years. For every 100 females, there were 101.9 males. For every 100 females age 18 and over, there were 104.0 males.

The median income for a household in the town was $45,114, and the median income for a family was $47,361. Males had a median income of $29,833 versus $27,734 for females. The per capita income for the town was $18,783. About 3.6% of families and 5.1% of the population were below the poverty line, including 5.9% of those under age 18 and 8.3% of those age 65 or over.

Notable people
Lucian Pulvermacher, Pope Pius XIII

References

External links 
 1852 plat map covering town of Rock
 1879 plat map
 1896 plat map
 1909 plat map
 1928 plat map
 1956 plat map

Towns in Wood County, Wisconsin
Towns in Wisconsin